Oktyabrsky (Russian and ) is a city in the Republic of Bashkortostan, Russia, located on the Ik River. Population:  Oktyabrsky was ranked first among Category II cities (population 100,000 or higher, excluding administrative centers) in the 2015 edition of Most Comfortable City in Russia.

Administrative and municipal status
Within the framework of administrative divisions, it is incorporated as the city of republic significance of Oktyabrsky—an administrative unit with the status equal to that of the districts. As a municipal division, the city of republic significance of Oktyabrsky is incorporated as Oktyabrsky Urban Okrug.

Transportation
The city is served by the Oktyabrsky Airport.

References

Notes

Sources

Cities and towns in Bashkortostan